Darjar (also Romanized as Dārjār; also known as Dārījār) is a village in Natel Kenar-e Olya Rural District, in the Central District of Nur County, Mazandaran Province, Iran. At the 2006 census, its population was 162, in 42 families.

References 

Populated places in Nur County